ISO 3166-2:GB is the entry for the United Kingdom of Great Britain and Northern Ireland in ISO 3166-2, part of the ISO 3166 standard published by the International Organization for Standardization (ISO), which defines codes for the names of the principal subdivisions (e.g., provinces or states) of all countries coded in ISO 3166-1. The codes and structures used are provided to the ISO by British Standards and the Office for National Statistics.

Currently for the United Kingdom, ISO 3166-2 codes are defined for the following subdivisions:
 3 countries and 1 province
 25 two-tier counties, 36 metropolitan districts, 58 unitary authorities, 32 London boroughs and 1 city corporation (England)
 11 districts (Northern Ireland)
 32 council areas (Scotland)
 22 unitary authorities (Wales)

Each code consists of two parts, separated by a hyphen. The second part is three letters, which is the British Standard BS 6879 three-letter code of the subdivision.

Though  is the United Kingdom's ISO 3166-1 alpha-2 code,  is exceptionally reserved for the United Kingdom on the request of the country. Its main usage is the .uk internet ccTLD and, on 28 September 2021,  replaced  as the official country code on car registration plates.

Current codes
Subdivision names are listed as in the ISO 3166-2 standard published by the ISO 3166 Maintenance Agency (ISO 3166/MA).

BS 6879 gives alternative name forms in Welsh (cy) for some of the Welsh unitary authorities (together with alternative code elements). Since this part of ISO 3166 does not allow for duplicate coding of identical subdivisions, such alternative names in Welsh and code elements are shown for information purposes only in square brackets after the English name of the subdivision.

Countries and province

 
Wales was changed from being described as a principality to being described as a country in the December 2011 update to the standard. England and Scotland were maintained as country and Northern Ireland was maintained as province.

Included for completeness

Second-level subdivisions

 Notes

Changes
The following changes to the entry have been announced in newsletters by the ISO 3166/MA since the first publication of ISO 3166-2 in 1998. ISO stopped issuing newsletters in 2013.

The following changes to the entry are listed on ISO's online catalogue, the Online Browsing Platform:

As of 2020 GB-EAW, GB-GBN, and GB-UKM subdivisions are only mentioned in remark part 2 in the ISO website.

See also
 Subdivisions of the United Kingdom
 Subdivisions of England
 Subdivisions of Northern Ireland
 Subdivisions of Scotland
 Subdivisions of Wales
 FIPS region codes of the United Kingdom
 NUTS codes of the United Kingdom
 Chapman codes

References

External links 
 ISO Online Browsing Platform: GB
 Statoids.com: Divisions of the United Kingdom

2:GB
Lists of subdivisions of the United Kingdom
United Kingdom geography-related lists
Metropolitan boroughs
Non-metropolitan counties
Council areas of Scotland
 
London boroughs
Principal areas of Wales
Unitary authority districts of England